The Miracle of Morgan's Creek is a 1944 American screwball comedy film written and directed by Preston Sturges, starring Eddie Bracken  and Betty Hutton, and featuring Diana Lynn, William Demarest and Porter Hall. Brian Donlevy and Akim Tamiroff reprise their roles from Sturges' 1940 film The Great McGinty.

The Miracle of Morgan's Creek, which was filmed in 1942 and early 1943, but not released until 1944, was nominated for a 1945 Academy Award for Best Original Screenplay, and in 2001, it was selected for preservation in the United States National Film Registry by the Library of Congress as being "culturally, historically, or aesthetically significant." The film ranks #54 on the American Film Institute's 100 Years... 100 Laughs list of the top 100 funniest films in movie history.

Plot
Trudy Kockenlocker is the daughter of the town constable of Morgan's Creek. Against her father's orders, she attends a wild farewell party for a group of soldiers at which she hits her head on a chandelier while dancing. The next morning, Trudy is in a daze and slowly begins to recall the previous night's events. She had married a soldier but cannot remember his name, except that "it had a z in it. Like Ratzkywatzky...or was it Zitzkywitzky?" She believes that she and the groom had used fake names, so she doesn't know how to get in touch with him and cannot remember what he looks like. She also does not have the marriage license.

Trudy learns that she became pregnant that night as well. Norval Jones, a local 4-F boy who has been in love with Trudy for years, steps in to help out, but Trudy's overprotective father becomes involved and complicates matters. Norval and Trudy devise a plan: they will get married secretly under false names, which will provide her a marriage certificate with the fake name of Ratzkywatzky and help her avoid a scandal. Later, Trudy will get a divorce, and she and Norval will get married legitimately.

At the rushed wedding ceremony, in which Norval wears an antique WW1 “doughboy” uniform, a frazzled Norval mistakenly signs his real name and the minister calls the police. Norval is brought to the Kockenlocker house where military, state and federal officers fight with Constable Kockenlocker over jurisdiction. Norval is accused of abducting Trudy, impersonating a soldier, impairing the morals of a minor, resisting arrest and perjury. Trudy's father arrests Norval and locks him in the town jail after the justice of the peace rips up the fake marriage certificate. Trudy then tells her father the truth about the marriage, her pregnancy and Norval's attempt to pose as her groom. Her father agrees to let Norval escape so that he can find Trudy's real husband.

Needing money to begin his quest but with the bank where he works closed for the night, Norval sneaks into the bank with the constable's assistance to take $900 while leaving his bonds there that are worth the same amount. Trying to open a safe, Norval trips the burglar alarm, so Trudy and her sister Emmy tie up their father at the police station to make it look as if he had been incapacitated by a burglar. After months in hiding, Norval appears at his attorney's office, where he learns that the constable was fired after his ruse was not believed and that the Kockenlockers have moved out of town. Norval's attorney urges him to disappear, but Norval is determined to find Trudy. However, he is spotted in town by the bank manager, who alerts the police.

Near the end of her pregnancy at Christmas time, the constable approaches the city council to tell them that Trudy wants to tell the real story and exonerate Norval. But before she can do so, Trudy goes into labor and is rushed to the hospital, where she gives birth to sextuplets, all boys. After receiving the news, Governor McGinty and The Boss demand that Norval be set free, with the charges dropped. Trudy's first marriage is annulled and Trudy and Norval are declared to be married after all. The governor even gives Norval a retroactive commission in the state guard, entitling him to legally wear a uniform, and Trudy’s father is named police chief.

When Norval discovers that Trudy has given birth to six boys, he is overwhelmed, and the film ends with this epilogue on a title card:

Cast

Songs
In addition to the music score by Charles Bradshaw and Leo Shuken, two songs appear in the film:

"The Bell in the Bay" – music and lyrics by Preston Sturges
"Sleepy Summer Days" – music by Ted Snyder, lyrics by Sturges

Production
Although shot in 1942 and early 1943, The Miracle of Morgan's Creek was withheld from distribution until early 1944, because Paramount had a backlog of unreleased films, including Preston Sturges' The Great Moment.  In September 1942, Paramount sold a number of films, such as I Married a Witch, to United Artists, which needed to keep its distribution pipeline filled, but Paramount held on to The Miracle of Morgan's Creek because it was directed by Sturges, waiting for an opportunity to release it.

Problems arose with Hays Office censors because of the film's subject matter. In October 1942, after a story conference, the office sent Paramount a seven-page letter outlining their concerns, including those about lines spoken by the 14-year-old character Emmy and the Trudy character having been drunk and then pregnant. The office wanted the filmmakers to be "extremely careful in handling a subject of this kind because of the delicate nature of the high point of the story," and to refrain from reiterating the basic facts of the story after they have been presented. In December 1942, they also warned about making any comparisons between Trudy's situation and the virgin birth of Jesus. There were so many objections from the censors that Sturges began production with only 10 approved script pages.

The War Department had concerns with the film's portrayal of the departing soldiers, demanding that the film "should result in giving the audience the feeling that these boys are normal, thoroughly fit American soldiers who have had an evening of clean fun."

Sturges' intent was to "show what happens to young girls who disregard their parents' advice and who confuse patriotism with promiscuity," and had included in his script a sermon for the pastor to deliver, expressing Sturges' opinions, but the scene was cut by the studio because the pastor was depicted in too comic a manner.

The Miracle of Morgan's Creek was in production from October 21 to December 23, 1942, with additional scenes shot on February 25, 1943. Outdoor scenes were shot at the Paramount Ranch in Agoura, California.

The film premiered at New York's Paramount Theatre on January 19, 1944. To promote the film, Paramount aired a 20-minute preview on the some 400 television sets then in use in New York City on March 21, 1944, with stills from the film, narration by Eddie Bracken and an interview with Diana Lynn. Paramount asked reviewers not to reveal the ending to avoid spoiling it for those who had not yet seen the film. It is believed that Sturges also withheld the ending from the Hays Office.

The Miracle of Morgan's Creek is one of the few Paramount sound films produced before 1950 that do not belong to EMKA, Ltd./NBCUniversal, along with My Friend Irma, Sorry, Wrong Number, and The Buccaneer.

The 1958 film Rock-A-Bye Baby, starring Jerry Lewis, was loosely based on The Miracle of Morgan's Creek. Sturges received a credit for that film, but did not actually participate in the project.

The film was released on DVD and VHS on September 6, 2005.

Reception
The Miracle of Morgan's Creek received critical praise. Bosley Crowther wrote in The New York Times: "a more audacious picture—a more delightfully irreverent one—than this new lot of nonsense at the Paramount has never come slithering madly down the path. Mr. Sturges ... has hauled off this time and tossed a satire which is more cheeky than all the rest...It's hard to imagine how he ever got away with such a thing, how he ever persuaded the Hays boys that he wasn't trying to undermine all morals...Maybe the humor is forced a little, and it may be slightly difficult at times to understand precisely what in heck is going on. But that doesn't make any difference. At those times, you can catch your breath."

Writing in the Los Angeles Times, reviewer Edwin Schallert wrote: "It is a feature that is intensely, even stridently, a departure from the normal Hollywood output...you can have all the fun you wish out of this picture if you won't try to take it too seriously at any time. It belongs essentially to the screwball comedy school, and goes to most outlandish lengths in its climax, which has the misfortune to show up the whole thing."

Critic James Agee noted that "the Hays office has either been hypnotized into a liberality for which it should be thanked, or has been raped in its sleep" to allow the film to be released. In a second review, Agee described the film as "a little like taking a nun on a roller coaster."

Although the Hays Office received many letters of protest because of its subject matter, the film was Paramount's highest-grossing film of 1944, taking in $9 million in box-office receipts while playing to standing-room-only audiences in some theaters.

Accolades

 The New York Times named it as one of the 10 Best Films of 1942–1944.
 In 2001, the film was selected for preservation in the United States National Film Registry by the Library of Congress as being "culturally, historically, or aesthetically significant."
 In 2006, the film was voted by Premiere one of "The 50 Greatest Comedies of All Time."

The film is recognized by the American Film Institute in these lists:
 1998: AFI's 100 Years...100 Movies – Nominated
 2000: AFI's 100 Years...100 Laughs – #54
 2007: AFI's 100 Years...100 Movies (10th Anniversary Edition) – Nominated

See also
 The Dionne quintuplets

References

External links

1944 films
1944 romantic comedy films
1940s screwball comedy films
American romantic comedy films
American satirical films
American screwball comedy films
American black-and-white films
Films directed by Preston Sturges
Films set on the home front during World War II
Paramount Pictures films
United States National Film Registry films
Films with screenplays by Preston Sturges
1944 comedy films
1940s American films